Breadcoin is a community food token created in 2016 to help address the food needs of disadvantaged populations.

The token is issued by the Breadcoin Foundation, Ltd., a 501(c)3 nonprofit registered in Washington DC. Over 60 food vendors in the Washington DC and Baltimore Maryland area accept the currency.
Local nonprofits distribute breadcoins to those with food-insecurity. Recipients can then use the tokens to purchase food at any of the vendors, increasing their food options and helping them retain their dignity.

References

Alternative currencies
Social welfare charities